Anton Glasnović (born 18 January 1981) is a Croatian sports shooter who competes in shotgun events. His biggest success to date was reaching the trap final at the 2012 Summer Olympics in London.

His also won a gold medal in team trap along with his national team teammates, his brother Josip Glasnović and Giovanni Cernogoraz at the 2012 European Shotgun Championships in Larnaca.

At the 2012 Olympics he managed to qualify for the Olympic final in fifth place with a score of 122. In the final, Glasnović scored 21 out of a possible 25 and finished the competition in 6th place with a total score of 143.

In 2013, Glasnović and his teammates defeated European title at the 2013 European Shotgun Championships in Suhl, Germany. Later that year, in September, Glasnović won individual silver at the 2013 World Shotgun Championships, his first individual championship medal, as well as team bronze with his national team teammates, Giovanni Cernogoraz and Saša Sedmak.

Olympic results

References

External links
Profile at the International Shooting Sport Federation website

1981 births
Living people
Croatian people of Kosovan descent
Croatian male sport shooters
Olympic shooters of Croatia
Shooters at the 2012 Summer Olympics
Trap and double trap shooters
Sportspeople from Zagreb
European Games competitors for Croatia
Shooters at the 2015 European Games
Shooters at the 2019 European Games